Oleg Kolesnikov (born September 11, 1968, Krasnogorsk, Moscow Oblast) is a Russian political figure and deputy of the 5th, 6th, 7th, and 8th State Dumas.

In 1989, Kolesnikov started engaging in business, first as an assistant broker on the stock exchange and then as deputy director. From 1996 to 1998, he served as an assistant on commerce and economics at the Chelyabinsk network of pharmacies named "Klassika". In 2005, he was elected deputy of the Legislative Assembly of Chelyabinsk Oblast and ran for the Liberal Democratic Party of Russia. In 2007, he became deputy of the 5th State Duma from the Chelyabinsk Oblast constituency. In 2011, he left the Liberal Democratic Party of Russia to become a member of the United Russia. In 2011, 2016 and 2021, he was re-elected for the 6th, 7th, and 8th State Dumas respectively.

In 2019–2021, Kolesnikov was involved in a series of scandals. For instance, it was revealed that in the 1990s, he was convicted of violating three articles of the Criminal Code of Russia, including "sale and distribution of drugs", "engagement in prohibited types of individual activities", and "conduction of illegal business". At the same time, the accumulated debts of Kolesnikov and his wife's business exceeded 1.3 billion rubles. Despite it, Kolesnikov's candidacy was still supported by the governor Aleksey Teksler. According to the local media, in exchange for the support, Kolesnikov promised to build in the region a new aquapark.

References

1968 births
Living people
United Russia politicians
21st-century Russian politicians
Eighth convocation members of the State Duma (Russian Federation)
Seventh convocation members of the State Duma (Russian Federation)
Sixth convocation members of the State Duma (Russian Federation)
Fifth convocation members of the State Duma (Russian Federation)